Little Rosey is an animated television series produced by Canada-based Nelvana. The series first aired on ABC (part of its Saturday morning block) in 1990. It was Roseanne Barr's first attempt at a cartoon.

Plot
Loosely based on comedian Roseanne Barr's childhood, the series revolved an young 8-year-old Rosey and her two best friends Tess and Buddy. The three would use their imaginations to overcome the obstacles they faced, such as spelling bees, family vacations, and rules that their parents forced upon them.

Among the recurring characters were Rosey's parents, her younger sister Nonnie, and her baby brother Tater, and a pair of nemesis science nerds.

Production
In 1990, this animated series aired late in the day on ABC's Saturday morning lineup. Two years later, an animated special called The Rosey and Buddy Show was produced as a primetime special that aired on May 15, 1992, in which Rosey and Buddy invade Cartoonland to take on the meddling executives who wanted to "change their show". In the 1992 special, Barr voiced the character.

Cast
Kathleen Laskey as Rosey
Roseanne Arnold as Rosey (The Rosey and Buddy Show)
Noam Zylberman as Buddy
Tom Arnold as Buddy (The Rosey and Buddy Show)
Paulina Gillis as Tess, Additional voices (The Rosey and Buddy Show)
Lisa Yamanaka as Nonnie and Tater
Judy Marshak as Rosey's mother
Tony Daniels as Rosey's father
Steven Bednarski as Jeffrey and Matthew

Guest stars
Eva Almos as Swift Heart Rabbit from The Care Bears Family (The Rosey and Buddy Show)
Richard Binsley (The Rosey and Buddy Show)
Len Carlson (The Rosey and Buddy Show)
Luba Goy as Treat Heart Pig and Lotsa Heart Elephant from The Care Bears Family (The Rosey and Buddy Show)
Paul Haddad (The Rosey and Buddy Show)
Dan Hennessey as Brave Heart Lion from The Care Bears Family (The Rosey and Buddy Show)
Ellen-Ray Hennessy (The Rosey and Buddy Show)
Roy Kenner (The Rosey and Buddy Show)
Keith Knight (The Rosey and Buddy Show)
Stephen Ouimette as Beetlejuice (The Rosey and Buddy Show)
Ron Rubin (The Rosey and Buddy Show)
John Stocker (The Rosey and Buddy Show)
Maria Vacratsis (The Rosey and Buddy Show)

Episodes
Each episode consisted of two 11-minute segments.

See also

Roseanne

References

External links

Little Rosey episode guide at Big Cartoon Database

1990s American animated television series
1990 American television series debuts
1990 American television series endings
1990s Canadian animated television series
1990 Canadian television series debuts
1990 Canadian television series endings
American Broadcasting Company original programming
American children's animated comedy television series
Canadian children's animated comedy television series
Animated television series about children
Cultural depictions of American women
Cultural depictions of comedians
Cultural depictions of actors
Television series by Nelvana
Television series created by Roseanne Barr
Animation based on real people
English-language television shows